= Labour Relations Law, 1962 =

1962 Ethiopian legislation

The Labour Relations Law was a legislation in Ethiopia, passed in 1962. The law provided the first legal sanction for the establishment of trade unions in the country.
